Başbakanlık Kupası may refer to one of the two football knockout competitions:
Chancellor Cup a defunct competition in Turkey
Başbakanlık Kupası (Northern Cyprus)

tr:Başbakanlık Kupası